Talabı (also, Bash Talaby and Bash-Talabi) is a village and municipality in the Quba Rayon of Azerbaijan.  It has a population of 409.  The municipality consists of the villages of Talabı and Toxmar.

References

External links

Populated places in Quba District (Azerbaijan)